P90 or P-90 may refer to:

 P-90, an electric guitar pickup
 FN P90, a Belgian personal defense weapon
 , a patrol boat of the Royal Australian Navy
 Nikon Coolpix P90, a digital camera
 Papyrus 90, a biblical manuscript
 Ruger P90, an American pistol
 Toyota Starlet (P90), a Japanese hatchback
 P90, a state regional road in Latvia